Comedy Album Heroes was a radio programme that aired from June 2001 to July 2003.  There were eight half-hour episodes and it was broadcast on BBC Radio 4.  It starred Greg Proops.

References 
 Lavalie, John. "Comedy Album Heroes." EpGuides. 21 Jul 2005. 29 Jul 2005  <http://epguides.com/ComedyAlbumHeroes/>.

BBC Radio 4 programmes
2001 radio programme debuts